"Come Again (The Quetzal)" is a single by Danish singer Soluna Samay. It was released as a Digital download in Denmark on June 15, 2012. The song entered the Danish Singles Chart at number 18.

Live performances
On June 18, 2012 she performed the song live on Aftenshowet.

Track listing

Chart performance

Release history

References

2012 singles
2012 songs
Sony Music singles
Songs written by Remee